The First Federal League of Yugoslavia's 1953/1954 season was the highest level football competition held in communist Yugoslavia between 1953 and 1954. The league was won by Croatian side NK Dinamo Zagreb.

Teams
Due to the league's expansion from 12 to 14 teams two clubs were relegated and four teams were promoted at the end of the previous season.

League table

Results

Winning squad
Champions:
Dinamo Zagreb (coach: Ivan Jazbinšek)

players (league matches/league goals): 
Ivica Banožić 3 (0)
Aleksandar Benko 21 (13)
Zvonimir Cimermančić 2 (0)
Dragutin Cizarić 9 (0)
Tomislav Crnković 20 (0)
Željko Čajkovski 24 (13)
Vladimir Čonč 26 (13)
Dionizije Dvornić 26 (16)
Emil Ferković 10 (0)
Drago Horvat 6 (0)
Ivan Horvat 20 (0)
Dragutin Kukec 3 (0)
Luka Lipošinović 10 (3)
Vladimir Majerović 10 (0)
Lav Mantula 21 (2)
Stojan Osojnak 10 (9)
Branko Režek 23 (2)
Zvonko Strnad 1 (0)
Josip Šikić 25 (0)

Top scorers

See also
1953–54 Yugoslav Second League
1953 Yugoslav Cup

External links
Yugoslavia Domestic Football Full Tables

Yugoslav First League seasons
Yugo
1